Fadel Nasser Sarouf, born Valentin Sarov on April 17, 1976 in Bulgaria, is a naturalized Qatari weightlifter who competed in the men's 77 kg weight class at the 1999 World Weightlifting Championships, finishing eighth.

One of eight Bulgarian weightlifters recruited by the Qatar Olympic Committee for $1,000,000, Sarouf became a Qatari citizen in order to represent the country, changing his name from Valentin Sarov in the process.

References 

1976 births
Living people
Bulgarian emigrants to Qatar
Sarov, Valentin
Qatari male weightlifters
Naturalised citizens of Qatar
Weightlifters at the 2002 Asian Games
Asian Games competitors for Qatar